In projective geometry, the harmonic conjugate point of an ordered triple of points on the real projective line is defined by the following construction:
Given three collinear points , let  be a point not lying on their join and let any line through  meet  at  respectively.

This fact follows from Desargues theorem.

In real projective geometry, harmonic conjugacy can also be defined in terms of the cross-ratio as .

Cross-ratio criterion
The four points are sometimes called a harmonic range (on the real projective line) as it is found that  always divides the segment  internally in the same proportion as  divides  externally. That is:

If these segments are now endowed with the ordinary metric interpretation of real numbers they will be signed and form a double proportion known as the cross ratio (sometimes double ratio)

for which a harmonic range is characterized by a value of −1. We therefore write:

The value of a cross ratio in general is not unique, as it depends on the order of selection of segments (and there are six such selections possible). But for a harmonic range in particular there are just three values of cross ratio:  since −1 is self-inverse – so exchanging the last two points merely reciprocates each of these values but produces no new value, and is known classically as the harmonic cross-ratio.

Note that when , then  is negative, and that it is positive outside of the interval.
The cross-ratio  is a ratio of division ratios, or a double ratio. So the division ratio criterion is that they be additive inverses.

Harmonic division of a line segment is a special case of Apollonius' definition of the circle.

In some school studies the configuration of a harmonic range is called harmonic division.

Of midpoint

By the cross-ratio criterion, the harmonic conjugate of  will be  when . Nevertheless,

thus motivating inclusion of a point at infinity in the projective line. This point at infinity serves as the harmonic conjugate of the midpoint .

From complete quadrangle
Based on four points, the complete quadrangle has pairs of opposite sides and diagonals. In the expression of harmonic conjugates by H. S. M. Coxeter, the diagonals are considered a pair of opposite sides:

It was Karl von Staudt that first used the harmonic conjugate as the basis for projective geometry independent of metric considerations:
...Staudt succeeded in freeing projective geometry from elementary geometry. In his , Staudt introduced a harmonic quadruple of elements independently of the concept of the cross ratio following a purely projective route, using a complete quadrangle or quadrilateral.

To see the complete quadrangle applied to obtaining the midpoint, consider the following passage from J. W. Young:
If two arbitrary lines  are drawn through  and lines  are drawn through  parallel to  respectively, the lines  meet, by definition, in a point  at infinity, while  meet by definition in a point  at infinity. On the other hand, that  is the midpoint of the segment  follows from the familiar proposition that the diagonals of a parallelogram bisect each other.

Quaternary relations
Four ordered points on a projective range are  called harmonic points  when there is a tetrastigm in the plane such  that  the  first and third are codots and the other two  points are on the connectors of the third codot.

Similarly, if the axis of a pencil of planes is skew to a straight with harmonic  points, the planes on the points are harmonic planes.

A set of four in such a relation has been called a harmonic quadruple.

Projective conics
A conic in the projective plane is a curve  that has the following property:
See the article Pole and polar for more details.

Inversive geometry

In the case where the conic is a circle, on the extended diameters of the circle, harmonic conjugates with respect to the circle are inverses in a circle. This fact follows from one of Smogorzhevsky's theorems:

Galois tetrads
In Galois geometry over a Galois field  a line has  points, where . In this line four points form a harmonic tetrad when two harmonically separate the others. The condition

characterizes harmonic tetrads.

Iterated projective harmonic conjugates and the golden ratio
Let  be three different points on the real projective line. This sequence is convergent.

For a finite limit  we have 

where  is the golden ratio, i.e.  for large .
For an infinite limit we have

For a proof consider the projective isomorphism 

 

with

References

 Juan Carlos Alverez (2000) Projective Geometry, see Chapter 2: The Real Projective Plane, section 3: Harmonic quadruples and von Staudt's theorem.
 Robert Lachlan (1893) An Elementary Treatise on Modern Pure Geometry, link from Cornell University Historical Math Monographs.
 Bertrand Russell (1903) Principles of Mathematics, page 384.

Projective geometry